Kimya Dawson (born November 17, 1972) is an American folk singer-songwriter, one half of the anti-folk duo the Moldy Peaches. Dawson's work with the Moldy Peaches earned them a cult following and critical acclaim, with their 2001 song "Anyone Else But You" landing a spot in multiple acclaimed indie film soundtracks. "Anyone Else But You" as performed by Michael Cera and Elliot Page charted on the Billboard Hot 100 after its prominent inclusion in the 2007 film Juno, the soundtrack of which includes several songs by Dawson and her associated musical acts. The song remains Dawson's highest charting single to date. In addition to their work with the Moldy Peaches, Dawson has released seven solo studio albums and collaborated with various other artists from a diverse range of genres, including  Aesop Rock, They Might Be Giants, The Mountain Goats, and Third Eye Blind.

Career
Dawson became well known as co-founder of the Moldy Peaches alongside Adam Green. Since the Moldy Peaches went on hiatus in 2004 Dawson has released a string of lo-fi homemade albums and toured widely in North America and Europe. Dawson's children's album, Alphabutt, was released on September 10, 2008. Song titles include "The Alphabutt Song," "Seven Hungry Tigers," "Little Monster Babies," "Wiggle My Tooth" and "Pee Pee in the Potty," and collaborators include former Third Eye Blind guitarist Kevin Cadogan and a number of Dawson's other musical friends and their children. They have also been invited to participate in the Sesame Street television program.

In September 2012, they appeared in a campaign called "30 Songs / 30 Days" to support Half the Sky: Turning Oppression into Opportunity for Women Worldwide, a multi-platform media project inspired by Nicholas Kristof and Sheryl WuDunn's book.

Soundtrack work
Dawson's songs are featured in the films The Guatemalan Handshake and Glue, both of which were shown at the Olympia Film Festival in November 2007.

In 2008 Dawson contributed the song "Anthrax"—about 9/11—to the soundtrack of the Body of War documentary.

"Anyone Else But You", a song they recorded with the Moldy Peaches, was used in the documentary Murderball, about a team of wheelchair rugby players. This song was also used in the film Juno. The melody of this song, with new lyrics, was used in a commercial for Atlantis.com.

Critics warmly received the music in Juno, where Dawson's "sweetly melancholic acoustic-strummed tunes" helped define the character of a pregnant young teenager who decides to have her baby. Dawson helped choose many of the songs for the Juno film, helping to set the film's mood. The soundtrack was voted by NPR listeners as the 14th best of the year in a listener poll for 2008. Dawson sings about diverse topics:

Dawson's authentic persona has a demeanor which is "sheepish and guileless and awkward in a way that you really can't fake" and who sometimes looks "legitimately terrified" during performances, according to Village Voice music critic Rob Harvilla.

Five of Dawson's solo songs, two from Antsy Pants, as well as one from the Moldy Peaches, are included on the Juno soundtrack, released in December 2007.  Composer Mateo Messina also based the film's score on Dawson's music.

The soundtrack album, after two weeks topping Billboard's Digital Albums chart, reached No. 8 on the Billboard 200, in its first week of release. In its first full week of physical release the album sold 68,000 copies, reaching No. 3 on the Soundscan album chart. It missed out on the No. 1 spot by only 2,600 copies. The following week it jumped to #2, while selling 15% fewer copies (58,000), just 2,000 copies behind first place. In the album's third week of physical release it finally made the No. 1 spot on the Billboard 200 and Soundscan charts, selling 65,000 copies.  The soundtrack for Juno won a Grammy for Best Compilation Soundtrack in 2009, beating out American Gangster, August Rush, Mamma Mia and Sweeney Todd.

Two songs were also included in the soundtrack to Unmade Beds.

Other collaborations

Dawson performs on recordings by Ben Kweller, They Might Be Giants, The Mountain Goats, John Wayne Shot Me, Your Heart Breaks, and The Terrordactyls.

The Third Eye Blind track "Self-Righteous" on their album Out of the Vein features a duet with Dawson and Third Eye Blind's lead singer Stephan Jenkins. Dawson also appears on the Third Eye Blind album, Ursa Major, on the track "Why Can't You Be". This song was available as a bonus track on the iTunes Store download.

Regina Spektor collaborated with Dawson on the song "Fire" on the Hidden Vagenda album. Dawson also collaborated with fellow antifolk Jeffrey Lewis. They made a band called 'The Bundles,' with Jack Lewis and drummer, Anders Griffen, though released the songs under the name "Kimya Dawson and Jeffrey Lewis", on a split with Jeffrey Lewis and Diane Cluck.

Under the name Geniusis, Dawson released the free album Holiday Rampage alongside Aesop Rock, Johnny Druelinger, Jason Carmer and Quinn Tuffinuff.

In February 2011, Dawson recorded a Daytrotter session with Aesop Rock, in which they performed three songs together. This session was later released in May 2011. Dawson and Aesop collaborated under the name The Uncluded to release an album, Hokey Fright.

Dawson released the solo album Thunder Thighs in October 2011. The album features guest performances by Aesop Rock, John Darnielle of the Mountain Goats, Nikolai Fraiture of the Strokes, Forever Young Senior Citizen Rock & Roll Choir, Olympia Free Choir, Quinn Tuffinuff, Daniel Bryan, Dawson's child Panda and more.

They have performed numerous times with Paul Baribeau, whom they references several times in their songs.

Dawson played An Evening of Awesome at Carnegie Hall with John Green and Hank Green on January 15, 2013.

On February 11, 2013, Dawson released their first music video as The Uncluded on YouTube, a group featuring Aesop Rock and themselves. The single is titled "Earthquake". Their debut album Hokey Fright was released on May 7, 2013. The video for their third single "Delicate Cycle" has a cameo of Lil Bub.

Personal life
On Christmas Day in Port Townsend, Washington in 1998, Dawson accidentally overdosed on whiskey and prescription pills. Dawson suffered a grand mal seizure and vomited blood, which Dawson then inhaled. To the surprise of Dawson's doctors, Dawson woke up from a coma in a hospital the next day.

Dawson moved to Bedford Hills, New York, in December 2005. In 2006, Dawson married musician Angelo Spencer. In July 2006, Dawson gave birth to a child, Panda, and in November 2006 moved the new family to Olympia, Washington.

Dawson is good friends with AEW wrestler Bryan Danielson (aka Daniel Bryan), who appears as a guest artist on the Thunder Thighs track "Captain Lou", written in homage to wrestling manager Lou Albano.

Prior to 2007, Dawson once joked that she is a cousin of The Strokes' drummer Fabrizio Moretti. From the joke started a myth that they are actually cousins.

Dawson came out as non-binary on November 22, 2019.

Discography
Before the Moldy Peaches' Rough Trade releases there were several homemade CDRs.

With the Moldy Peaches
The Moldy Peaches – Released September 11, 2001 by Rough Trade Records
County Fair/Rainbows – A single released in 2002
Moldy Peaches 2000: Unreleased Cutz and Live Jamz 1994-2002 – Released March 18, 2003 by Rough Trade Records and Jess Turpin

Solo albums
I'm Sorry That Sometimes I'm Mean – released November 5, 2002 by Rough Trade Records
Knock Knock Who? – released August 3, 2004 by Important Records
My Cute Fiend Sweet Princess – released August 3, 2004 by Important Records
Hidden Vagenda – released October 5, 2004 by K Records
Remember That I Love You – released May 9, 2006 by K Records
Alphabutt – released September 2008 by K Records
Thunder Thighs – released October 18, 2011 by Great Crap Factory
”Follow That Dream” released in 2023

With Antsy Pants
Antsy Pants – released 2006 by Plan It X Records

With The Bundles
The Bundles – released 2009 by K Records

With The Uncluded
Hokey Fright – released July 5, 2013 by Rhymesayers Entertainment

Compilations
 Third Eye Blind's 2009 album: Ursa Major [Bonus Track Version] – "Why Can't You Be" (With Kimya Dawson) [Bonus Track]
 Third Eye Blind's 2003 album: Out of the Vein – "Self Righteous"
 Antifolk Vol. 1 – "I'm Fine"
 Anticomp Folkilation – "Will You Be Me" (Live)
 Afro-Punk Compilation Record Vol. 1 – "Loose Lips"
 AFNY Collaborations. Volume 1 – Kimya Dawson and Jeff Lewis
 Titanium Heart and Chains of Love – Kimya Dawson and Matt Rouse EP (collaboration) Unicorn Sounds
 A.K.A.- smooth jams e.p. with Adam Green and Akida Junglefoot Dawson
 The Art Star Sounds Compilation February 2005 – "Velvet Rabbit" (Live)
 No Parachute. Vol. 1. A compilation of indie music videos. (DVD) – "Lullaby For The Taken" (video directed by Ted Passon). 2005, Happy Happy Birthday To Me Records.
 Robot Boy DVD. Compilation of short films and videos by Ted Passon. – "Lullaby For The Taken". 2005, K Records/Secretly Canadian.
 I Killed the Monster: 21 Artists Performings the Songs of Daniel Johnston – "Follow That Dream" 2006, Second Shimmy
Juno Soundtrack – Rhino Records 2008
 The Terrordactyls song "Devices" featuring guest vocals by Kimya DawsonBody of War: Songs that Inspired an Iraq War Veteran'' – "Anthrax". Sire Records March 18, 2008
 Tallahassee Turns Ten: a Mountain Goats Cover Album (2012)

Notes

References

External links

Audio and video
Kimya Dawson and Matty Pop Chart – Live at the Cedar Cultural Center in Minneapolis, Minnesota on November 28, 2008 (YouTube)
Kimya on the Live Music Archive
PUNKCAST#1099 Live video – Union Hall, Brooklyn – January 20, 2007 (RealPlayer)(mp4)
Kimya at Amoeba Hollywood

Interviews
Scene Missing Magazine Interviews Kimya Dawson February 1, 2005
Kimya Dawson interview on MonsterFresh.com March 2008
Kimya Dawson interview on Ground Control March 2008
Kimya Dawson interview on BeatLawrence.com April 2008
Kimya Dawson on Amoeba

1972 births
African-American women singer-songwriters
K Records artists
People from Bedford Hills, New York
Living people
Musical groups established in 1995
Anti-folk musicians
American hip hop singers
Olympia
Musicians from Olympia, Washington
Folk punk musicians
21st-century American women singers
21st-century American singers
The Moldy Peaches members
21st-century African-American women
20th-century African-American people
Non-binary musicians
20th-century African-American women
The Bundles members